Ronald Bartlett Levinson (October 18, 1896 in Chicago, Illinois – November 21, 1980 in Bangor, Maine) was an internationally renowned American philosopher who focused in his work on Plato.

Life 

 1920 A.B. (Bachelor of Arts) from Harvard University.
 1924 Ph.D. from the University of Chicago.
 1926 University of Maine.
 1927 Professor and Head of the department of philosophy.

Works 

Levinson focused in his works on Plato and the history of Platonism. He gained international awareness by his book In Defense of Plato (1953) in which he defended Plato against Karl Popper's sharp criticism, who considered Plato to be the forerunner of totalitarianism.

Levinson was a member of the American Philosophical Association and of the Society of Ancient Philosophy.

 Thomas Taylor, the Platonist (1924)
 Spenser and Bruno (1928)
 The college journey - an introduction to the fields of college study (1938)
 In Defense of Plato (1953).
 A Plato reader (1966)

External links 
 Ronald B. Levinson in: Who's who in Philosophy (1942)
 Dedication to Ronald B. Levinson in the 1963 yearbook

1896 births
1980 deaths
Platonists
Harvard University alumni
University of Chicago alumni
University of Maine faculty
20th-century American philosophers
American scholars of ancient Greek philosophy